The Eastern Independent Schools of Melbourne (EISM or EIS) are a group of twenty two independent secondary schools in Melbourne, Victoria, Australia. The schools compete against one another in sporting competitions.

History
The first instance of the Independent Schools in the Eastern suburbs of Melbourne coming together is in 1964 as the Eastern Independent Schools Association. Initially the competition was for boys only, and the only sport offered was Australian Rules Football. It developed rapidly to include Athletics, Cross-Country and Swimming carnivals, Cricket, Tennis, and Debating. These competitions were held on Saturdays. The 1966 Swimming carnival was held at Croydon Memorial Pool on 5 March. Tennis, Softball and a Swimming carnival were contested for the first time in the 1971 season. The Boys by this stage had included Soccer, Basketball and Table Tennis into their sporting fixtures.

Cultural Component
Part of the original intention of the EISM was for it to have a cultural component for the boys. This took the form of a Music Festival. Students from all schools would meet at a central venue and give a performance. The girls also had the opportunity to do this and also participate in a Drama festival which was discontinued in 1982 due to lack of interest.

Amalgamation of EISA & EIGSA
In 1978, moves were initiated to combine the boys and girls competitions, with the 2 meeting formally in the middle of Term 2, 1978. After 12 months of joint meetings, the motion That there be an amalgamation of E.I.S.A. with E.I.G.S.A. to form one association was put to the principals' meeting on 8 August 1979. The motion was defeated. An alternative motion was then put which established a committee of principals and sport teachers whose task was to investigate the special needs of schools and also draw up a draft set of rules and regulations. The second draft of this committee had the name of the association as the ESISA, The Eastern Suburban Independent Schools Association. Eventually, the name Association of Eastern Independent Schools was agreed upon in April 1980.

Schools

Current Member Schools

Former Member Schools

Eastern Independent Girls Schools Association (1970–1980)
There was a push for girls to have access to inter-school sport, and after extensive meetings in 1970 the following schools formed the EIGSA:

Carnivals

Swimming – Division 1

Athletics – Division 1

Cross Country 
Note that schools are divided into three separate divisions which are determined by student population rather than level of ability.
 Eastern Division (1990–present)
 Central Division (1998–present)
 Southern Division (2013–present)

Presidents of the Association

Sports
Students from Eastern Independent Schools of Melbourne participate in a wide range of sporting activities including:
Weekly Sports
 Badminton
 Basketball
 Cricket
 Football
 Hockey
 Indoor Cricket
 Indoor Soccer
 Lawn Bowls
 Netball
 Soccer
 Softball
 Table Tennis
 Tennis
 Touch Football
 Ultimate Frisbee
 Volleyball

Carnivals
 Swimming
 Track and Field
 Cross Country

See also 
 List of schools in Victoria, Australia

References

External links 
 EISM Website

 
Australian school sports associations